Mackage is a Canadian outerwear clothing brand. It has stores in Canada, the US, China, South Korea, Japan and London.

Mackage was founded in Montreal in 1999 by designer Eran Elfassy, with Elisa Dahan joining in 2001. Elfassy and Dahan have known each other since elementary school.

References

External links 

 Official website

Canadian companies established in 1999
Clothing brands of Canada
Clothing retailers of Canada
1999 establishments in Quebec
Clothing companies established in 1999
High fashion brands
Outdoor clothing brands